Panathinaikos AC Women's Basketball is the women's basketball department of the major Greek multi-sport club Panathinaikos A.O. The club is based in Athens, Greece. The department was founded in 1937 creating the first and oldest women's basketball team in the country. Pavlos and Thanasis Giannakopoulos Indoor Hall is the home arena of the team.

They have won the Greek Championship 5 times (1997–98, 1999–00, 2004–05, 2012–13, 2020–21) and the  Greek Cup once (1999–00).

Roster

Depth chart

Honours
 Greek Championship
 Winner (5): 1997–98, 1999–00, 2004–05, 2012–13, 2020–21
 Greek A2 Championship
 Winner (1): 2018–19
 Greek Cup
 Winner (1): 1999–00
 Double (unofficial)
 Winners (1): 1999–00
  EuroLeague Women
 top-16 (1): 2000–01
  Ronchetti Cup
 Quarter-finals (1): 1997–98

Notable players

  Yelena Leuchanka
  Eva Guneva
  Kornelija Kvesić
  Eleanna Christinaki
  Athina Christoforaki
  Jacki Gemelos
  Lila Hatzioridou
  Dimitra Kalentzou
  Viktoria Klantzou
  Afroditi Kosma
  Anastasia Kostaki
  Lolita Lymoura
  Aristea Maglara
  Evanthia Maltsi
  Roula Mouli
  Nena Nikolaidou
   Orthoula Papadakou
  Afentra Papadimou
  Dimitra Papamichael
  Yasemi Samantura
  Katerina Spatharou
  Evdokia Stamati
  Alexia Trialoni
  Valanti Tsompanaki
  Elena Vlani
  Stojna Vangelovska
  Gabriela Mărginean
  Jasmina Ilić
  Niky Avery
  Erin Batth
  Kim Butler
  Mandi Carver
  Claire Coggins
  Diana Delva
  Jennifer Derevjanik
  Feyonda Fitzgerald
  Tracy Gahan
  Michele Van Gorp
  Vicky Hall
  Sequoia Holmes
  Brandie Hoskins
  Yvette Jarvis
  Kelly Komara
  Giuliana Mendiola
  Kolby Morgan
  Jordan Murphree
  Casey Nash
  Monique Oliver
  Morgan Pullins
  Kristen Rasmussen
  Chastity Reed
  Crystal Robinson
  Trisha Skibbe
  Chelsie Schweers
  Erin Thorn
  Lindsey Wilson
  Kirstyn Wright

Completed list of former Panathinaikos Women players by Eurobasket.com

Notable coaches

Champion rosters

Kit manufacturers and Shirt sponsors

Academies staff

Gallery

See also
 Panathinaikos Men's BC

References

External links
 Official website 
 Panathinaikos Women Team Eurobasket.com

Basketball
Basketball teams established in 1937
Women's basketball teams in Greece
Basketball teams in Athens
Sports clubs in Athens
1937 establishments in Greece